Nina Valentinova Abramova (later Zvereva, born 2 February 1949) is a retired Russian rower who won six European titles and two silver medals at the world championships between 1968 and 1977.

References

External links
 

1949 births
Living people
Russian female rowers
Soviet female rowers
World Rowing Championships medalists for the Soviet Union
European Rowing Championships medalists